Belleview is an unincorporated community and census-designated place (CDP) in Boone County, Kentucky, United States. The population was 343 at the 2010 census.

Geography

Belleview is the location of six places listed on the U.S. National Register of Historic Places:
Belleview Baptist Church
Belleview Post Office
Clore House
Jonas Clore House
Flick House
James Rogers House

References

External links
 

Census-designated places in Boone County, Kentucky
Census-designated places in Kentucky
Unincorporated communities in Kentucky
Unincorporated communities in Boone County, Kentucky
Kentucky populated places on the Ohio River